Bongolwethu Makeleni (born 5 February 1994) is a South African cricketer. He made his first-class debut for Border in the 2017–18 Sunfoil 3-Day Cup on 7 December 2017. He made his List A debut for Border in the 2017–18 CSA Provincial One-Day Challenge on 9 December 2017.

In August 2018, he was named in Border's squad for the 2018 Africa T20 Cup. He made his Twenty20 debut for Border in the 2018 Africa T20 Cup on 14 September 2018.

References

External links
 

1994 births
Living people
South African cricketers
Border cricketers
Place of birth missing (living people)